Aphelia albidula is a species of moth of the family Tortricidae. It is found in China, where it has been recorded from Jilin (Jingyuetan Forest Farm) and Beijing (Mount Baihuashan).

References

Moths described in 1992
Aphelia (moth)
Moths of Asia